Anthony John Billingsley is an Australian political analyst and senior lecturer at the University of New South Wales. His main interests include Middle Eastern politics and international law. 
Billingsley is known for his analyses on the Arab Spring, Gaza–Israel conflict, Iranian foreign policy, Iraqi Kurdistan and the political succession in the Arab World.

Books
 Political Succession in the Arab World: Constitutions, Family Loyalties and Islam, Routledge 2010, 
 International Law and the Use of Force: A Documentary and Reference Guide, Shirley V Scott, Anthony John Billingsley and Christopher Michaelsen, Praeger 2010,

References

External links
Anthony Billingsley at UNSW
Anthony Billingsley talks International Relations
Who are ISIL? - Interview with Anthony Billingsley - YouTube

Academic staff of the University of New South Wales
Australian scholars
International relations scholars
Alumni of the University of Strathclyde
Macquarie University alumni
University of New South Wales alumni
Living people
Australian political scientists
Year of birth missing (living people)